Hummingfield Chalice Nkosinathi Ndwandwe (born 1959) is a South African Anglican bishop: he has been Bishop of Mthatha since 2017. On 9 July 2021 he was elected to be the diocesan bishop of the Diocese of Natal, by an electoral college of bishops for the Province of Southern Africa, meeting online.

Ndwandwe was born in Nongoma and ordained in 1983. He was previously Suffragan Bishop of Natal.

Notes

21st-century Anglican Church of Southern Africa bishops
Anglican bishops of Mthatha
Living people
1959 births
People from Nongoma Local Municipality